The 1943 Nobel Prize in Literature was not awarded due to the ongoing World War II. Instead, the prize money was allocated with 1/3 to the Main Fund and with 2/3 to the Special Fund of this prize section. This was the seventh occasion in Nobel history that the prize was not conferred.

Nominations
Despite no author(s) being awarded for the 1941 prize due to the ongoing second world war, a number of literary critics, societies and academics continued sending nominations to the Nobel Committee of the Swedish Academy, hoping that their nominated candidate may be considered for the prize. In total, the academy received 21 nominations for 20 individuals.

Five of the nominees were newly nominated namely Sri Aurobindo, John Steinbeck (awarded in 1962), Franz Werfel, Elisaveta Bagryana, and Franz Hellens. The highest number of nominations – two nominations – was for the Danish author Johannes Vilhelm Jensen, who was awarded in 1944. Four of the nominees were women namely Gabriela Mistral (awarded in 1945), Elisaveta Bagryana, Henriette Charasson, and Maria Madalena de Martel Patrício.

The authors Carlos Arniches, Stephen Vincent Benét, Laurence Binyon, Pieter Cornelis Boutens, Robin George Collingwood, Virgilio Dávila, Jovan Dučić, Louis Esson, Nordahl Grieg, Radclyffe Hall, Georg Hermann, Ida Lee, Guido Mazzoni, Arthur Mee, Beatrix Potter, Susan Stebbing, Helene Stöcker, Annie S. Swan, Frida Uhl, Else Ury, Beatrice Webb, and Simone Weil died in 1943 without having been nominated for the prize.

References

1943
Cultural history of World War II